Masoud Homami (born 1 May 1983) is an Iranian football goalkeeper who is a member of Mashin sazi in the Azadegan League. He is a former member of Sepahan and Zob Ahan.

Club career

Club career statistics

References

External links
 Masoud Homami at IranLeague.ir

Living people
1983 births
Iranian footballers
Association football goalkeepers
Fajr Sepasi players
Rah Ahan players
Sepahan S.C. footballers
Shahrdari Tabriz players
Zob Ahan Esfahan F.C. players
Paykan F.C. players
Persepolis F.C. players
Tractor S.C. players